Uno is a small unincorporated community in Hart County, Kentucky, United States, located east and slightly north of Horse Cave on U.S. Route 31E.

Uno originally was known locally as a trading point of moonshine. According to tradition, discreet buyers of moonshine would say they were going to "You know" in order to get their supply.

References

Unincorporated communities in Hart County, Kentucky
Unincorporated communities in Kentucky